Hanak's dwarf bat or Hanak's pipistrelle (Pipistrellus hanaki) is a species of bat only found in Cyrenaica, Libya and Crete, Greece.

Taxonomy
Pipistrellus hanaki was described as a new species in 2004. Its description was the result of a taxonomic split of the common pipistrelle. The holotype was collected in Cyrenaica, which is in eastern Libya. The eponym for the species name "hanaki" is Czech Republic scientist Vladimír  Hanák, for his significant contribution "to the knowledge  of  the  Palaearctic  bat  fauna". Hanák was also the first to point out the difference of this taxon from other members of the common pipistrelle species complex.

Range and habitat

In Crete, Hanak's dwarf bat was recorded in mosaics of oak trees (mainly Quercus pubescens), cypresses (Cupressus sempervirens), olive trees (Olea europea), carob trees (Ceratonia siliqua) and to a lesser extend other cultivated trees (including Ficus carica and Prunus spp.).

Echolocation

This species uses the same range of frequencies as the common pipistrelle, but its specific social calls allow a clear separation from the other pipistrelle species.

Conservation

This species is protected in the European Union under the Habitats Directive, Annex IV. This species is also listed in the Berne Convention and is specifically targeted by the UNEP-EUROBATS convention.

References

Pipistrellus
Bats of Europe
Mammals described in 2004
Bats of Africa